Kaadhali is a 1997 Indian Tamil-language romance film directed by Siddhu. The film stars Vignesh, Devayani, Karan and Divya. It was released on 25 July 1997.

Cast
Vignesh as Gopal
Devayani as Deivanai
 Divya Jaiswal as Stella
Karan
Vadivelu
Jayachitra
Kavitha
Dr. Sharmila as Interviewer
R. Sundarrajan
Vinu Chakravarthy

Production
The film marked the debut of director Siddhu, who chose to cast Vignesh and Devayani in the film's lead roles. Likewise Hindi actress Divya, previously seen in the Hindi film Loha (1997), made her debut in Tamil films with the project.

Soundtrack
The music was composed by Deva, with lyrics written by Ponniyin Selvan, Kalidasan and Palani Bharathi.

References

1997 films
1990s Tamil-language films
Indian romantic drama films
1997 romantic drama films
Films scored by Deva (composer)

External links